Sutter Hill Ventures is an American private equity firm focused on venture capital investments in technology-based start-up companies.  Founded in 1964, Sutter Hill is one of the oldest venture capital firms still in operation. Based in Palo Alto, CA, the firm is primarily focused on investments in the fields of networking and computer technology, business and financial services, healthcare, web development, and pop culture, and have been known to invest in angel funds. The firm currently holds positions in a number of publicly traded companies, including Restoration Robotics (HAIR), Pure Storage (PSTG), Mattersight (MATR), Forty Seven (FTSV), Threshold Pharmaceuticals (THLD), Molecular Templates (MTEM), Cardica (CRDC), and Corcept Therapeutics (CORT). The firm has also incubated and invested in Snowflake Computing (SNOW) which had the record-setting technology IPO in 2020.

History
Sutter Hill Ventures was founded in 1964 by Bill Draper and Paul Wythes. It began as an off-shoot of a real estate firm and was licensed as a Small Business Investment Company. The firm was an early investor in companies including Qume, a maker of disk drives and printers acquired in 1978 by ITT, and Diablo Systems, a pioneer of daisy-wheel printers that was acquired by Xerox in 1972. In the 1980s, the firm provided seed money for LSI Logic and Banyan Systems.

References

External links

Financial services companies established in 1964
Companies based in Palo Alto, California
Private equity firms of the United States
1964 establishments in California
Venture capital firms of the United States